Solomon Borisovich Pikelner (February 6, 1921 -  November 19, 1975) was a Soviet astronomer who had made a significant contribution to the theory of the interstellar medium, solar plasma physics, stellar atmospheres, and magnetohydrodynamics. He was professor of astronomy at Moscow State University since 1959. The crater Pikelner on the Moon and asteroid 1975 Pikelner (see List of asteroids/1001–2000) bear his name.

External links
 Biography

Soviet astronomers
1921 births
1975 deaths
Academic staff of Moscow State University